John Kelley Norton (April 16, 1893 – December 28, 1979) was an American athlete who competed mainly in the 400 metre hurdles. He was born in Santa Clara, California and died in New York City. Norton competed for the United States at the 1920 Summer Olympics held in Antwerp, Belgium in the 400 metre hurdles where he won the silver medal.

References

External links
 profile

1893 births
1979 deaths
American male hurdlers
Olympic silver medalists for the United States in track and field
Athletes (track and field) at the 1920 Summer Olympics
World record setters in athletics (track and field)
Medalists at the 1920 Summer Olympics